Delias lara is a butterfly in the family Pieridae. It was described by Jean Baptiste Boisduval in 1836. It is found in New Guinea.

The wingspan is about 60–70 mm. Adults are very similar to Delias mysis, but the subapical spots on the upperside of the forewings are white, quite poorly developed and sometimes absent. Furthermore, the subapical spots on the underside of the forewings are yellow and somewhat larger.

Subspecies
D. l. lara (Waigeu, New Guinea, Mysol, Milne Bay, Numfor, Yule)
D. l. hideyoae Nakano, 1995 (Japen island)
D. l. goodenovii (Rothschild, 1915) (Goodenough islands)
D. l. maga Grose-Smith, 1897 (Sud-Est island)
D. l. rosselliana Rothschild, 1915 (Rossell islands)

References

External links
Delias at Markku Savela's Lepidoptera and Some Other Life Forms

lara
Butterflies described in 1836